Frank Huon Chesterman Ballantyne (30 September 1891 – 11 September 1940) was an Australian rules footballer who played with Fitzroy in the Victorian Football League (VFL).		

After making four appearances with Fitzroy in 1916 (all losses), Ballantyne enlisted to serve in World War I, serving overseas for two years before returning to Australia in 1918.

Notes

External links 
		

1891 births
1940 deaths
Australian rules footballers from Victoria (Australia)
Fitzroy Football Club players
Australian military personnel of World War I